Sacculosia  is a genus of moths of the family Crambidae. It contains only one species, Sacculosia isaralis, which is found in Colombia.

References

Spilomelinae
Taxa named by Hans Georg Amsel
Monotypic moth genera
Crambidae genera